Tanyard Branch is a  long 2nd order tributary to Cherrystone Creek in Pittsylvania County, Virginia.  Tanyard Branch forms the southeast boundary of Chatham, Virginia.

Course 
Tanyard Branch rises in the northeastern part of Chatham, Virginia and then flows southeast to join Cherrystone Creek in the southeastern part of Chatham.

Watershed 
Tanyard Branch drains  of area, receives about 45.6 in/year of precipitation, has a wetness index of 389.95, and is about 46% forested.

See also 
 List of Virginia Rivers

References 

Rivers of Virginia
Rivers of Pittsylvania County, Virginia
Tributaries of the Roanoke River